Ilias Vouras (born 20 February 1988) is a Greek former professional footballer who played as a goalkeeper.

Career

U.S.D. Arezzo
In 2006, Ilias Vouras started his career in Arezzo. He stayed for 6 months without any appearance. In December 2006, Arezzo decided to terminate his contract.

Kerkyra
In January 2007, Kerkyra signed him as a free agent and used him in 2 matches until 2009.

Kozani
Kozani bought him from Kerkyra in 2009. He managed to play in 59 games, having a good appearance.

Niki Volos
His good performances attracted Niki Volos and he immediately gained his position in the first team. In two seasons, he played 59 games. The 2012-2013 season, he was considered one of the top goalkeepers of Football League (Second Division).

AEK
In the summer of 2013, AEK decided to buy Ilias Vouras from Niki Volos. He signed a contract for four years, stating: "I am very happy that I belong to the family of AEK. I came to a great club among people who will make AEK starring again".

Retirement
At the end of January 2020, Vouras announced that he had retired.

Honours
AEK Athens
Football League: 2014–15 (South Group)
Football League 2: 2013–14 (6th Group)
Greek Cup: 2015–16

References

External links
 
Myplayer.gr Profile
Aekfc.gr Profile

1988 births
Living people
Greek footballers
Greek expatriate footballers
Iraklis Thessaloniki F.C. players
S.S. Arezzo players
A.O. Kerkyra players
Niki Volos F.C. players
AEK Athens F.C. players
Kozani F.C. players
Doxa Drama F.C. players
Kalamata F.C. players
Association football goalkeepers
Greek expatriate sportspeople in Italy
Expatriate footballers in Italy
Footballers from Thessaloniki